Ophisma cuprizonea  is a moth of the family Erebidae. It is found in Madagascar.

References

Ophiusina
Moths of Madagascar
Moths described in 1913